Mimostedes ugandicola is a species of beetle in the family Cerambycidae. It was described by Breuning in 1955. It is known from Ethiopia and Uganda.

References

Desmiphorini
Beetles described in 1955